Boopedon auriventris, the short-winged boopie, is a species of slant-faced grasshopper in the family Acrididae. It is found in North America.

References
Notes

Sources
 Capinera J.L, Scott R.D., Walker T.J. (2004). Field Guide to Grasshoppers, Katydids, and Crickets of the United States. Cornell University Press.
 Otte, Daniel (1995). "Grasshoppers [Acridomorpha] D". Orthoptera Species File 5, 630.

Further reading

 

Gomphocerinae
Insects described in 1899